The Indian Railways Institute of Electrical Engineering (IRIEEN), Nashik, was set up by Indian Railways at Nashik in Maharashtra for imparting training to newly appointed officers of the Indian Railway Service of Electrical Engineers, recruited through an Engineering Services Examination conducted by the Union Public Service Commission, New Delhi. The institute was set up in 1988 at Nashik, Maharashtra. The institute is headed by the director. He is assisted by a team of nine faculty members who have practical experience as well as technical qualifications.

As laid down by the Railway Board, the institute imparts training as a statutory measure to:
 IRSEE Probationers.
 Integrated orientation course for Group-B  Officers in all aspects of the working of   Electrical Department before their absorption in Group-A services.
 Senior Professional Development Course for Junior Administrative Grade officers prior to their being considered for promotion to Selection Grade.
It also has a supervisor training center (STC) to impart induction and refresher training to supervisors, junior engineers and senior section engineers. In addition to the above, short-term special courses are also conducted throughout the year on specialized subjects with the latest technical know-how and as requests received from zonal railways.

The IRIEEN is one of six centralised training institutes that share the task of training of officers. The other centralised training institutes are:
 Indian Railways Institute of Transport Management, Lucknow for Indian Railway Traffic Service Officers recruited through the Civil Services Exam.
 Indian Railways Institute of Civil Engineering, Pune for civil engineers,
 Indian Railways Institute of Mechanical and Electrical Engineering & Jamalpur Gymkhana, Jamalpur for mechanical engineers
 Indian Railways Institute of Signal and Telecommunications Engineering, Secunderabad for engineers of S&T department
 RPF Academy Lucknow, for officers of Railway Protection Force and
 Railway Staff College, Vadodara, functions as the apex training institute for the officers of all departments in general and the Accounts, Personnel, Stores, and Medical departments in particular.

See also
 Indian Railways organisational structure

References

External links
 Official website of the IRIEEN

Training institutes of Indian Railways
Education in Nashik
1988 establishments in Maharashtra